Olom Panyang is an Indian politician from the state of Arunachal Pradesh.

Panyang was elected from the Mariyang-Geku constituency in the 2014 Arunachal Pradesh Legislative Assembly election, standing as a BJP candidate.

See also
Arunachal Pradesh Legislative Assembly

References

External links
Olom Panyang profile
MyNeta Profile
Janpratinidhi 

People from Hawai, Arunachal Pradesh
Arunachal Pradesh MLAs 2014–2019
Living people
Bharatiya Janata Party politicians from Arunachal Pradesh
Year of birth missing (living people)